Shahpur, Shapur, Shahpoor, or Shahapur may refer to:

People 
 Shapur (name), Persian given name and a list of people with the name

Places

India

Bihar 
 Shahpur, Bihar, a city in Bhojpur district
 Shahpur, Bihar Assembly constituency
 Shahpur, Aurangabad, a village in Aurangabad district
 Shahpur, Araria, a village in Araria district
 Shahpur, Saharsa, a village in Saharsa district
 Shahpur Patori railway station in Shahpur Patori block

Delhi 
 Shahpur Jat, an urban village in South Delhi

Gujarat 
 Shahpur, Gujarat, a city and notified area in Ahmedabad district
 Shahpur, Kheralu, a village in Kheralu taluka, Mehsana district
 Shahpur Mosque, a mosque in Ahmedabad
 Shapur Sorath, a town in Junagadh district

Haryana 
 Shahpur, Indri, a village in Indri Tehsil, Karnal district, Haryana
 Shahpur, Nissing, a village in Nissing, Karnal district, Haryana

Himachal Pradesh 
 Shahpur, Kangra, a village in Kangra district, Himachal Pradesh
 Shahpur (Himachal Pradesh Assembly constituency)

Jharkhand 
 Shahpur, Jharkhand

Karnataka 
 Shahapur, Karnataka, a city in Yadagiri district
 Shahapur, Karnataka Assembly constituency
 Shahapur, Belgaum, a village in Belgaum district

Madhya Pradesh 
 Shahpur, Betul, a census town in Betul district
 Shahpur, Berasia, a village in Berasia tehsil, Bhopal district
 Shahpur, Huzur, a village in Huzur tehsil, Bhopal district
 Shahpur, Burhanpur, a town and nagar panchayat in Burhanpur district
 Shahpur, Sagar, a town and nagar panchayat in Sagar district

Maharashtra 
 Shahapur (Thane), a census town in Thane district
 Shahapur, Maharashtra Assembly constituency
 Shahapur taluka
 Shahapur, Bhandara, a census town in the Bhandara District
 Shahapur, Buldhana, a town and historic place in Khamgaon tehsil, Buldhana District
 Shahapur, Ichalkaranji, part of the city of Ichalkaranji, Kolhapur district

Punjab 
 Shahpur, Phillaur, a village in Phillaur tehsil, Jalandhar District
 Shahpur Dogran, a village in Kapurthala district, Punjab

Telangana 
 Shapur Nagar, a corporation ward in Hyderabad

Uttar Pradesh 
 Shahpur, Pindra, a village in Pindra tehsil, Varanasi district
 Shahpur, Uttar Pradesh, a town and nagar panchayat in Muzaffarnagar district
 Shahpur Sirpura, a village in Sambhal district
 Shahpur, Chinhat, a village in Lucknow district
 Shahpur, Kakori, a village in Lucknow district
 Shahpur Majhgaon, a village in Lucknow district
 Shahpur Najol, a village in Lucknow district
 Shahpur Raja, a village in Lucknow district
 Shahpur, Lalganj, a village in Raebareli district

Iran (Persia) 
Shahpur, former name of Salmas, capital of Salmas County, West Azerbaijan Province
Shapur cave, in the Zagros Mountains near Bishapur
Shahpur Jan, village in the Central District, Shiraz County, Fars Province
Shapur-Khwarrah, administrative division of the Sasanian province of Pars
Shapur Rural District, in the Central District, Kazerun County, Fars Province
Bandar Shahpur, former name of Bandar-e Emam Khomeyni, city in Mahshahr County, Khuzestan Province
Jundi-Shapur or Gundeshapur, intellectual center of the Sassanid empire

Pakistan 
Shahpur, Punjab, a town in Sargodha District, Punjab province
Shahpur Tehsil, Pakistan
Shahpur District, historic district from 1893 to 1960, now called Shahpur Tehsil
Shahpur Dam, a dam in Attock District on Nandana River in Punjab province
Shahpur Chakar, a city in the Sanghar District, Sindh province
Shahpur Jehanian, a town in Sindh province

See also 
 Shahpura (disambiguation)
 Shapuree Island